Frederick Augustus Forbes (30 September 1818 – 9 July 1878) was a politician in colonial Queensland and Speaker of the Legislative Assembly of Queensland.

Early life
Forbes was born on 30 September 1818 in Liverpool, Sydney, New South Wales, to Francis Ewen, a merchant, and his wife Mary Ann Taboweur. He attended William Cape's school and The King's School, Parramatta, before spending several years at sea. When his father died he took over his father's store in Liverpool in 1842 before marrying Margaret Milner in 1844.

Politics 
Forbes soon moved to Ipswich where he opened another store and became involved in the Queensland Separation movement. Forbes became involved in politics and in 1860, along with Arthur Macalister and Patrick O'Sullivan, was elected to the new seat of Ipswich in the Queensland Legislative Assembly which he served until his defeat in 1863. He later served in the seat of Warrego from March 1865 to June 1867 and the seat of West Moreton from September 1868 until his retirement in November 1873. During this final term, Forbes spent two years as Speaker from 1871 to 1873.

Later life 
Though Forbes declared bankruptcy in 1870 because of the 1866-67 money crisis, he managed to quickly rebuild and was able to continue investing in businesses until his death. Forbes died as a result of an accident at Ipswich, Queensland, 9 July 1878 at the age of 59 and was survived by eleven out of his seventeen children.

See also 
 Members of the Queensland Legislative Assembly, 1860–1863 ; 1863–1867; 1868–1870; 1870–1871; 1871–1873

References

Speakers of the Queensland Legislative Assembly
Members of the Queensland Legislative Assembly
1818 births
1878 deaths
Politicians from Sydney
19th-century Australian politicians